Şamil Ayrım  ( born 1950 in Kars Turkey ) is a Turkish politician and member of Turkish Parliament. He is a member of Justice and development party in Turkey and deputy for Istanbul

References 

Living people
Turkish political people
1950 births